Court of Justice may refer to:

In general
 court, a court of law

Specific legal bodies
Caribbean Court of Justice (CCJ) of CARICOM
Court of Justice of the European Union (CJEU)
European Court of Justice (ECJ), the highest court in the CJEU
International Court of Justice (ICJ), a World Court of the UN
Court of Justice (Brazil)
Court of Justice (France), set up by the French Provisional Government after World War II
Ontario Court of Justice (Canada)
African Court of Justice of the African Union

Other uses
Court of Justice (film), a 1953 Spanish crime film

See also

 
 Court justice (disambiguation)
 Justice (disambiguation)
 Court (disambiguation)